Frankie Micallef (born 16 September 1945) was a Maltese international footballer who played for Floriana, as a midfielder.

Career
Micallef began his career with Floriana. He made his International debut with Malta national football team against Austria national football team

References

External links
 

1950 births
Living people
Maltese footballers
Malta international footballers
Floriana F.C. players
Association football midfielders